Kurt Mikael "Micke" Hasselborg (born 7 April 1954) is a Swedish curler and curling coach.

Awards
Collie Campbell Memorial Award: 1996.
In 1990 he was inducted into the Swedish Curling Hall of Fame.

Teams

Record as a coach of national teams

Personal life
He is from a well-known Swedish curling family; his older brother and longtime teammate Stefan, niece (Stefan's daughter) Maria, and his own children: daughter Anna (2018 Winter Olympics champion) and son Marcus.

References

External links
 
 
 

Living people
1954 births
Swedish male curlers
European curling champions
Swedish curling champions
Swedish curling coaches